Mark Clinton nicknamed "Pa" is an Australian former professional rugby league footballer who played in the 1980s and 1990s. He played for Parramatta in the NSWRL competition.

Playing career
Clinton made his first grade debut as a 25-year old in round 4 of the 1988 NSWRL season against Penrith at Penrith Stadium. In his first two seasons at Parramatta, Clinton was a regular starter in the front row. After missing the entire 1990 season, Clinton played a further six games for Parramatta in 1991. His final game in the top grade was in round 11 of the 1991 NSWRL season against South Sydney.

References

Parramatta Eels players
Australian rugby league players
Rugby league props
1963 births
Living people